Music SA, formerly AusMusicSA and also known as South Australian Contemporary Music Company Ltd, is a non-profit organisation whose aims are to promote, support and develop contemporary music in South Australia, which it does by providing training at many levels, professional development advice and live performance opportunities.

It presents the annual South Australian Music Awards, puts on the two-week celebration of live music, Umbrella: Winter City Sounds, and organises a number of other musical events throughout the year.

History
AusMusicSA was established on 23 July 1997 as the South Australian Contemporary Music Development Company, trading as AusMusic SA. In 2004, Music SA Online was established, and in 2005 the organisation started the Contemporary Music Program in 29 secondary schools. From 2007 to 2010, it ran the Louder Than Words Festival in regional SA, and from 2008 to 2012 the Coopers Alive Festival. It also managed the Fuse Festival.

In 2010, Music SA became a Registered Training Organisation, and in the same year Ausmusic SA was re-branded as Music SA. The organisation engaged in several collaborations with other partners, such as Flinders University, the Australian Independent Record Labels Association (AIR) Awards, and local radio stations, and has also published several guides relevant to the contemporary music industry.

In 2015 Lisa Bishop (who is also deputy chair of Adelaide Fringe and a film producer), became CEO/general manager of Music SA.

In 2015 Music SA took over responsibility for the Fowlers Live Music Awards, renamed the South Australian Music Awards (or SA Music Awards).

Umbrella: Winter City Sounds, a two-week live music festival, was launched in 2016, which in 2017 put on 300 events, funded by the Australia Council and the South Australian Tourism Commission and has been an annual event, until the cancellation in 2020 owing to the COVID-19 pandemic. It was scheduled to run from mid-July in 2021, but 80 live music events in the first week had to be cancelled owing to a 7-day lockdown across the state.

In 2017 Music SA launched the Girls to the Front music education program for teenage girls.

Description and governance 

Music SA's focus has broadened since its inception, from an organisation with a focus on music courses in schools to a nationally recognised industry body which "educates,...advocates, promotes, mentors, supports and markets artists and industry personnel and focusses on building a thriving contemporary music community in SA".

From sometime before 2007 until 2015, Music SA was located on Level 1 of the Lion Arts Centre, with the address given as "Fowlers Building" for some of that time. From 2015 and  it is situated in St Paul's Creative Centre in Pulteney Street.

Christine Schloithe was appointed CEO in May 2022.

Activities
Music SA's activities are aimed at benefiting the music industry in South Australia. To that end, it manages an informative SA music website; runs contemporary music workshops and training programs in schools; provides professional development services for artists and practitioners; runs music business events and seminars; provides opportunities for live performances; runs an accredited music business training program; runs Vocational Education Training (VET) programs for secondary schools; and since 2015 has been responsible for the SA Music Awards.

In collaboration with the Live Music Office, it creates the Live Music Census, which analyses the music supply chain in South Australia, including song-writing, retail, manufacturing, recording studios, dedicated music media, education, and live music gigs and festivals.

In addition to these, it puts on a number of events and programs: Umbrella: Winter City Sounds, a two-week festival; Adelaide Sounds, a live music series performed at Adelaide Airport every Friday afternoon and alternate Saturdays and Sundays since 2013; Bands On Track, a competition in which the winners get to play as support acts at the Superloop Adelaide 500 after-race concerts, and Clip It! music video competition. Umbrella: Winter City Sounds 2019 featured hundreds of acts in small venues across greater Adelaide.

In July 2017, Music SA created an event known as Scouted, an event run as part of Umbrella: Winter City Sounds and in conjunction with Australian Independent Record Labels Association (AIR), with the aim of giving a platform to some of South Australia's most prominent unsigned musical talents, spread across venues in Adelaide's East End. The first event featured electronic duo Electric Fields, Young Offenders, Bec Stevens, Alana Jagt, Timberwolf, Heaps Good Friends and others. The event helped to boost the participants' careers, and the 2018 event was held at around the same time as the AIR Awards and Indie-Con.

In the summer of 2018, Music SA and the City of Adelaide presented a series six of lunchtime and early evening concerts, called Rock The Square to showcase up-and-coming music talent in Adelaide. Lunchtime and evening concerts in Victoria Square/Tarndanyangga featured newcomers Kashaguava, Camp Coyote, Naomi Keyte, Cowboys of Love, hot mess, Madura Green, Alana Jagt and Corey Theatre Music.

South Australian Music Awards

Background
Fowler's Live Music Awards started in 2012, and these were renamed the South Australian Music Awards (or SA Music Awards or SAM Awards) when custodianship was handed to Music SA in 2015.

Funding
, Music SA receives funding from the Government of South Australia, previously through Arts South Australia and since 2018, through the Department of Innovation and Skills. It also receives project funding from the City of Adelaide, the Australian Hotels Association (SA Branch), APRA, AMCOS and the Live Music Events Fund. It also receives support from a range of commercial sponsors.

Pisoni praised Music SA for its work in raising the profile of the awards and the local music industry.

Funding for Indigenous musicians
In January 2019, Music SA announced the establishment of a new scholarship and internship plan for Aboriginal and Torres Strait Islander musicians, made possible by the support of an anonymous donor, whose contribution was matched by Music SA.

With this package came a commitment to establishing a national development program to help Indigenous musicians and groups tour and record, with the program and funding to be administered by Music SA.

References

External links

Music organisations based in Australia
Non-profit organisations based in South Australia
Music in Adelaide
Contemporary music organizations